Brian Vetter is a retired male lacrosse player who played midfield for the Chesapeake Bayhawks and the Philadelphia Barrage of Major League Lacrosse. Brian played his college ball for Towson University in Maryland. Brian was a part of the Chesapeake Bayhawks championship team in 2010.

References 

Living people
American lacrosse players
Lacrosse players from Baltimore
Year of birth missing (living people)